American III: Solitary Man is a studio album by Johnny Cash. It was released on October 17, 2000, by American Recordings. It is the third album in Cash's American series.

Background
Between American II: Unchained and American III: Solitary Man, Cash's health declined due to various ailments, and he was even hospitalized for pneumonia, and the illness forced him to curtail his touring. This album contained Cash's response to his illness, typified by a version of Tom Petty's "I Won't Back Down", as well as a version of U2's "One". Changes to Cash's voice due to his health problems are noticeable on most tracks when compared to his most recent preceding albums. Graeme Thomson has characterized "Solitary Man" as an act of emotional preservation.

Previous recordings
Three songs featured on the album had previously been recorded by Cash.
"Field of Diamonds" was previously recorded by Cash with Waylon Jennings for their 1986 album Heroes.
"Country Trash" was previously recorded by Cash for his 1973 album Any Old Wind That Blows.
"I'm Leavin' Now" was previously recorded by Cash for his 1985 album Rainbow.

Critical reception

American III: Solitary Man received mostly positive reviews from critics. At Metacritic, which assigns a normalized rating out of 100 to reviews from mainstream critics, the album received an average score of 80, which indicates "generally favorable reviews", based on 15 reviews. In a positive review for Entertainment Weekly, David Browne gave the album a Grade A rating, saying, "Though the Man in Black has rarely sounded blacker, producer Rick Rubin frames that deep sea voice with harmonies and churchly organs, making for a dark angel beauty of an album that's austere but welcoming." A review from Sonicnet praised Cash's ability to interpret songs and make them his own, saying, "When a tune falls into the jurisdiction of the venerable country-folk troubadour, the accumulated details of any previous readings or associations are stripped away, and its core brilliantly revealed." A review published by Billboard said the album "may lack the immediate impact of its predecessors but is no less a masterpiece." Splendid said that "the covers on American III will attract the majority of listener attention; Cash's own material steals the show." Jim DeRogatis of The Chicago Sun-Times wrote that it as "arguably the strongest of his American Recordings" with the series' "single best performance and most inspired cover choice via Cash's rendition of the Death Row anthem 'The Mercy Seat' by Nick Cave and the Bad Seeds."

Rolling Stone gave a mixed review, saying that "the onus here lies on the production… Rick Rubin's work is too timid; mostly, the shy combos of guitar, fiddle and accordion, or Benmont Tench's subliminal contributions on keyboards, make up the kind of severe meal that one is forced to think of as tasteful." In a mixed review, the A.V. Club said, "Like Neil Young's Silver And Gold, it feels like a thematically empty, knockabout place-holder. American Recordings, one of Cash's towering classics, was all devotion and doubt, a brilliant, raw-boned meditation on redemption and death. A loose, flat set of odds and ends, Solitary Man is merely a minor but endearing record from a man who seems to know he's given more than enough." The Spin Cycle called the album "mixed, leaning at times to inadvertent novelty."

Commercial performance
The album peaked at number eleven on the US Billboard Top Country Albums chart and at number 88 on the US Billboard 200.

Track listing

Personnel
 Johnny Cash – vocals, guitar
 Norman Blake – guitar
 Mike Campbell – guitar
 John Carter Cash – associate producer
 June Carter Cash – vocals (9)
 Laura Cash – fiddle
 Sheryl Crow – vocals (9), accordion (12, 14)
 Merle Haggard – guitar, vocals (13)
 Will Oldham – vocals (6)
 Larry Perkins – guitar
 Tom Petty – vocals, organ (1), vocals (2)
 Randy Scruggs – guitar
 Marty Stuart – guitar
 Benmont Tench – piano, organ, harmonium

 Martyn Atkins – photography
 Billy Bowers – digital editing
 Lindsay Chase – production coordinator
 Danny Clinch – photography
 David Coleman – art direction
 Richard Dodd – additional engineering
 David Ferguson – engineer, mixing
 Rick Rubin – producer
 D. Sardy – additional engineering
 David Schiffman – additional engineering, mixing (9)
 Eddie Schreyer – mastering
 Chuck Turner – digital editing

Charts
Album - Billboard (United States)

Weekly charts

Year-end charts

Certifications

Accolades

|-
|2001
| "Solitary Man"
| Grammy Award for Best Male Country Vocal Performance 
|
|-

References

Albums produced by Rick Rubin
Johnny Cash albums
2000 albums
American Recordings (record label) albums
Columbia Records albums
Gothic country albums
Sequel albums
Covers albums